Sebastiaan Jobb is a South African rugby union player for the  in the Currie Cup. His regular position is wing.

Jobb was named in the  squad for the 2021 Currie Cup Premier Division.

References

South African rugby union players
Living people
Rugby union wings
Blue Bulls players
Year of birth missing (living people)
Tel Aviv Heat players
South African expatriate sportspeople in Israel
South African expatriate rugby union players
Expatriate rugby union players in Israel